The 1973 Pacific hurricane season was an event in tropical cyclone meteorology. The most important system this year was Hurricane Ava, which was the most intense Pacific hurricane known at the time. Several other much weaker tropical cyclones came close to, or made landfall on, the Pacific coast of Mexico. The most serious of these was Hurricane Irah, which downed power and communication lines in parts of the Baja California Peninsula; the other landfalling storms caused rain and some flooding. No tropical cyclone this season caused any deaths.

This season had a quick start but a slow end. Overall activity was below average, with twelve named systems in total. Seven storms became hurricanes, of which three were major (Category 3 or higher on the Saffir-Simpson hurricane scale). Just one storm formed in August, one of the least active Augusts ever in the east Pacific. The season officially started May 15, 1973, in the eastern Pacific, and June 1, 1973, in the central Pacific, and lasted until November 30, 1973. These dates conventionally delimit the period of each year when most tropical cyclones form in the northeastern Pacific Ocean. All tropical cyclones this season formed in the eastern north Pacific Ocean, often off the coast of Mexico. As is usual in the northern hemisphere, most traveled generally westward or northwestward, and two reached as far as the waters south of the Hawaiian Islands.


Season summary 

The season began with the formation of the pre-Ava tropical depression on June 2 and ended with the dissipation of Tropical Lillian on October 9. The season lasted a total of 129 days. No named storms formed in May, three in June, four in July, one in August, three in September, one in October, and none in November. Another six tropical depressions formed during the year, but data on them is unavailable. All of these tropical cyclones formed in the eastern north Pacific tropical cyclone basin, which encompasses the Pacific Ocean north of the equator east of 140°W. None formed in the central north Pacific, which is the remainder of the Pacific Ocean east of the international dateline.

Of the tropical cyclones that formed this year, were twelve tropical storms and seven were hurricanes. Of those hurricanes, three of them were major hurricanes because they reached Category 3 or higher on the Saffir-Simpson Scale. These totals are all below the long-term averages of thirteen tropical storms, nine hurricanes, and four major hurricanes. At the time, this season's total of twelve named tropical cyclones was exactly average, although at the time the climatology in this basin was weak because satellite coverage was spotty before 1966.

This season, all advisories and tropical cyclone data were released and collected by two agencies, the Eastern Pacific Hurricane Center in Redwood City, California, and the Central Pacific Hurricane Center in Honolulu, Hawaii, both of which were coextensive with the National Weather Service Forecast Offices in their respective cities. The EPHC covered the area between the coast of North America and 140°W, and the CPHC the remainder of the area.

Systems

Hurricane Ava 

A tropical depression formed on June 2. It steadily strengthened and headed in a generally westerly direction. It moved slowly and became Hurricane Ava on June 4. Two days later, it became a major hurricane and it sped up. On June 7, it became a Category 5 hurricane. It then started weakening and slowed down until it dissipated on June 12. No deaths or damages were attributed to Hurricane Ava.

Ava's minimum central pressure was 915 millibars, and its maximum sustained winds reached . This made Ava the most intense recorded east Pacific hurricane at the time. Ava reached Category 5 intensity on June 7, the earliest date in an east Pacific season that a hurricane has done so. It was also the second known Category 5 storm in the east Pacific; (behind Patsy in 1959). Ava is the strongest June storm, the fifth most intense east Pacific hurricane, and was the only June Category 5 on record until 2010.

Ava was also flown into by hurricane hunter aircraft in what was the first penetration of a Pacific hurricane by NOAA aircraft. During these flights, radars and other devices were tested, and wind speed, pressure, and wave heights were measured. This is the reason why Hurricane Ava's pressure is measured instead of estimated. Ava was also photographed from Skylab because it was visible during one of the missions. At that time, it was coincidentally on the surface of the Earth directly underneath the space station. All in all, these made Hurricane Ava one of the best-observed Pacific hurricanes at the time.

Tropical Storm Bernice 

A nearly stationary disturbance in the Intertropical Convergence Zone spent three days organizing and finally developed into a tropical depression on June 22. The cyclone started heading northwest. It dissipated later that day. Bernice exposed two ships to gales, but otherwise neither deaths nor significant impact was reported.

Tropical Storm Claudia 

A tropical depression formed June 26 from a westward-moving area of disturbed weather. The next day, it developed gale-force winds and was named Claudia. It dissipated inland the next day. No deaths or casualties were reported due to this tropical cyclone.

Hurricane Doreen 

On July 18, a tropical storm formed from a disturbance in the Intertropical Convergence Zone and was named Doreen. It steadily intensified, and became a hurricane on July 19. It then weakened steadily as its path carried it on a direct path to the Big Island of Hawaii. Doreen weakened to a tropical storm as it entered the Central Pacific Hurricane Center's area of responsibility on July 25. A frontal system stuck between two high-pressure areas weakened as the two areas merged, creating a larger high pressure area that turned Doreen to the southwest on July 27. The hurricane then turned back to the northwest and strengthened back into a hurricane. It became a major hurricane again before weakening. Doreen dissipated August 3. Its remnant vortex continued westward until it dissipated under a trough near the dateline. Doreen's sudden change of track and restrengthening was unusual.

This tied Hurricane Celeste's record for longest-lasting Pacific hurricane. Doreen was also the longest-lasting July tropical cyclone. Hurricane Fico broke both of these records in the 1978 season. Doreen remains the eighth-longest lasting Pacific tropical cyclone, tied with two other storms. Several ships encountered Doreen. The most serious incident involved a Greek ship called Cornelia which lost its rudder in  waves, but managed to escape and continue on its way to Panama. On the afternoon of July 29,  swells and  waves were seen from Kapoho. Otherwise, no damages or deaths were blamed on this tropical cyclone.

Hurricane Emily 

A depression formed July 21 from squalls in the Gulf of Tehuantepec and headed west-northwest and strengthened into a tropical storm. Emily continued moving nearly parallel to the coast before turning to the west while steadily intensifying. Emily eventually reached Category 4 intensity on July 22. Emily then weakened as it turned to the northwest. It dissipated on July 28. This tropical cyclone caused no deaths or damage. Emily had a pressure of 972 mbar, which is unusually high for a hurricane of Category 4 strength.

Hurricane Florence 

On July 25, a depression formed off the coast of Guatemala. The storm made a close approach to the Mexican coast as a depression, but did not make landfall. Just after that, it strengthened into a tropical storm. Florence headed west and then west-northwest. It became a hurricane on July 29. It began weakening thereafter. Florence dissipated on July 30. No damages or deaths were reported.

Tropical Storm Glenda 

A depression that had formed on July 30 from a tropical disturbance quickly strengthened into a tropical storm and was named Glenda. It took a path similar to both Florence and Emily, but further from the shore. Glenda dissipated August 5. No deaths, damage, or other impact was reported.

Tropical Storm Heather 

The only storm to form in August this year formed on August 31 from an area of circulation in the ITCZ over the Gulf of Tehuantepec. It became a tropical depression on August 30. After moving northwest for a bit, it became a tropical storm and headed almost due north towards Mexico. Heather dissipated September 1, just before making landfall. Tropical Storm Heather caused no deaths or damage to any location in the coastal area of the Gulf of Tehuantepec.

Hurricane Irah 

A depression formed September 22. It became a tropical storm on September 23 and a hurricane on September 24. Irah took a northwesterly path and reached Category 2 strength on the Saffir-Simpson Hurricane Scale, and then dropped back down to a 1 as it recurved. Irah's first landfall was the strongest of the season. The hurricane dissipated on September 27 while heading east-northeast over mainland Mexico.

Irah blew over some power and communication lines during its passage over the southern tip of the Baja California Peninsula. Heavy rain fell over parts of Mexico, with the highest total being  at Sierra de la Laguna. One person was injured and at least ten houses were destroyed in Cabo San Lucas. No one was killed. There was some concern that the hurricane could disrupt splashdown procedures for astronauts at the end of Skylab 3; however, the return to Earth was not seriously affected.

Tropical Storm Jennifer 

On September 23, another depression formed. It took a northeasterly path, rotating around the southern periphery of Hurricane Irah as part of a Fujiwhara interaction. It strengthened into a tropical storm late on September 24. Jennifer then weakened to a depression and turned to the north-northeast. Jennifer brushed the Islas Marías. The cyclone made landfall near just southeast of Mazatlán and dissipated September 27. Tropical Depression Jennifer caused rain over several parts of Mexico. No one was killed and no damage was reported.

Hurricane Katherine 

Katherine became a tropical storm on September 29, just six hours after forming. It headed out to sea. On October 1, it became a Category 2 hurricane. It peaked in windspeed the next day. After weakening to storm strength, it crossed 140°W and entered the central Pacific. Katherine continued its slightly south of westward track. It dropped to a depression on October 9, and dissipated shortly after that due to the influence of a cold trough

Hurricane Lillian 

A depression that formed October 5 reached storm strength the same day. It generally paralleled the coast of Mexico far offshore. Lillian reached minimal hurricane strength on October 7 and peaked the next day. The hurricane began to weaken immediately thereafter and dissipated on October 9. Through its life, Lillian at first traveled generally west-northwestward, and then westward. Lillian never threatened land, causing no known impact.

Storm names 
These names were used for storms that formed in the eastern Pacific during this season. It is the same list used in the 1969 season. Storms were named Katherine and Lillian for the first time this year. No names were retired, so this list was used again in the 1977 season. Names that weren't assigned are colored gray.

The Central Pacific used names and numbers from the Western Pacific's typhoon list. No systems formed in the area, and thus no names were required.

Season effects 

This is a table of all of the storms in the 1973 Pacific hurricane season. It includes their durations, peak intensities, names, landfall(s), damages, and death totals. Deaths in parentheses are additional and indirect (an example of an indirect death would be a traffic accident), but are still storm-related. Damage and deaths include totals while the storm was extratropical or a wave or a low.

See also 

 List of Pacific hurricanes
 Pacific hurricane season
 1973 Atlantic hurricane season
 1973 Pacific typhoon season
 1973 North Indian Ocean cyclone season
 Australian cyclone seasons: 1972–73, 1973–74
 South Pacific cyclone seasons: 1972–73, 1973–74
 South-West Indian Ocean cyclone seasons: 1972–73, 1973–74

Notes

References

External links 
 Eastern North Pacific Hurricane Season of 1973
 CPHC season summary
 ATCR Eastern Pacific summary
 Unisys Archive

 
Articles which contain graphical timelines